Cinema may refer to:

Film
 Cinematography, the art of motion-picture photography
 Film or movie, a series of still images that create the illusion of a moving image
 Film industry, the technological and commercial institutions of filmmaking
 Filmmaking, the process of making a film
 Movie theater (US), called a cinema elsewhere, a building in which films are shown

TV 
 Home cinema tries to replicate the movie theater at home
 Cinema or Movie mode, a picture mode characterized by warmer color temperatures

Music

Bands
 Cinema (band), a band formed in 1982 by ex-Yes members Alan White and Chris Squire
 The Cinema, an American indie pop band

Albums
 Cinema (Andrea Bocelli album), released 2015
 Cinema (The Cat Empire album), released 2010
 Cinema (Elaine Paige album), released 1984
 Cinema (Nazareth album), or the title song, released 1986
 Cinema, a 2009 album by Brazilian band Cachorro Grande
 Cinema, a 1990 album by English musician Ice MC (Ian Campbell), or the title song
 Cinema, a 2004 album by Portuguese musician Rodrigo Leão
 Cinema, a 2010 album by Karsh Kale

Songs
 Cinema (Yes song), by the band Yes, from their 1983 album 90125
 "Cinema" (Benny Benassi song), from the 2011 album Electroman
 "Cinema" (Samuel and Francesca Michielin song), 2021
 "Cinema" (Harry Styles song), 2022
 "Cinéma", a song by Paola del Medico, Swiss entry in the Eurovision Song Contest 1980
 "Cinema 1", "Cinema 2" and "Cinema 3" by Brockhampton from Saturation III

See also
 
 
 Scinema, an Australian film festival
 Sinema (disambiguation)